Celypha sapaecola is a moth of the family Tortricidae. It is found in Vietnam.

The wingspan is about 14.5 mm. The ground colour of the forewings is whitish suffused and sprinkled with olive grey. The costal strigulae (fine streaks) are dense and whitish cream. The hindwings are brownish cream.

Etymology
The name refers to the type locality and Latin cola (meaning collected).

References

Moths described in 2009
Olethreutini
Moths of Asia
Taxa named by Józef Razowski